The 2014–15 Kategoria e Dytë, an Albanian association football league competition, was composed of 25 teams in 2 groups, A and B, respectively.

Changes from last season

Team changes

From Kategoria e Dytë
Promoted to Kategoria e Parë:
 Iliria
 Sopoti
 Besëlidhja
 Naftëtari

To Kategoria e Dytë
Relegated from Kategoria e Parë:
 Albpetrol
 Himara

Promoted from Kategoria e Tretë:
 Tirana B

Participating teams
Group A 

Group B

League tables

Group A

Group B

Final

See also
Football in Albania

References

3
Albania
Kategoria e Dytë seasons